Gerald Guy Cumming Routh (1916 Krugersdorp, South Africa – 1993 Brighton) was an economist whose academic career was spent largely at the University of Sussex, United Kingdom. He also had a spell at the ILO as a visiting associate at the IILS.

Early life 

His father, Charles Edward Arthur Routh (born in Salonika 1876), joined Imperial Yeomanry for the Boer War, serving in the elite unit 19th Coy. Paget's Horse, and stayed in South Africa after the war. He married Ethel Annie Cumming there and eventually settled in Krugersdorp, where he was superintendent of the hospital for the West Rand Consolidated Mine. He died of a heart attack when Guy was only 8, leaving three children fatherless. Guy eventually attended and graduated from the nearby Witwatersrand University in 1938 with a bachelor's degree in commerce.

Key works 

He is most noted for his The Origin of Economic Ideas

 Routh, Guy (1975) The Origin of Economic Ideas, London : Macmillan
 Routh, Guy (1984) Economics, an Alternative Text
 Routh, Guy (1984) What to teach to undergraduates, in Wiles, Peter and Routh, G. (Eds) Economics in Disarray, Oxford : Basil Blackwell
 Routh, Guy (1965) Occupation and Pay in Great Britain: 1906-60

Reviews 

Guy Routh. The Origin of Economic Ideas. Pp. vii, 321. White Plains, Reviewed The Annals of the American Academy of Political and Social Science 1976; 428;
Lichtenstein, Peter M. Journal of Economic Issues; Mar78, Vol. 12 Issue 1, p201-204, 4p Book Review of Guy Routh. The Origin of Economic Ideas.

References 

British economists
Academics of the University of Sussex
Historians of economic thought
1916 births
1993 deaths
20th-century South African historians
South African emigrants to the United Kingdom